Tony Mike Brumley (July 10, 1938 – August 8, 2016) was an American professional baseball player. A catcher and native of Granite, Oklahoma, he played for the Washington Senators of Major League Baseball for two full seasons (–) and part of a third. The ,  Brumley batted left-handed and threw right-handed. His son, also named Mike, played in all or parts of eight MLB seasons as an infielder and has remained in baseball as a minor-league manager and instructor.

Brumley originally signed with the Brooklyn Dodgers and played seven seasons in the Dodger farm system. A three-time minor league All-Star, Brumley appeared in a career-high 136 games with the Senators during his rookie season, but was relegated to a reserve role after hitting only .244.

In a three-season career, Brumley was a .229 hitter with five home runs and 50 RBI in 295 games. His 151 hits also included 24 doubles and two triples. He posted a .991 fielding percentage with only 10 errors in 1106 chances.

Brumley ended his pro career after the 1970 minor-league season. In retirement, he resided in Keller, Texas.

See also
Second generation MLB players

External links

Baseball Library
Retrosheet

1938 births
2016 deaths
Atlanta Crackers players
Baseball players from Oklahoma
Hawaii Islanders players
Kokomo Dodgers players
Major League Baseball catchers
Montreal Royals players
Oklahoma City 89ers players
Omaha Dodgers players
People from Greer County, Oklahoma
Reno Silver Sox players
Spokane Indians players
Washington Senators (1961–1971) players